Afro–desia is an album by American jazz organist Lonnie Smith recorded in 1975 and released on the Groove Merchant label.

Reception 

Allmusic's Jason Ankeny said: "'Afrodesia expands upon the soul-jazz sensibility of organist Lonnie Smith's classic Blue Note efforts, abandoning their hairpin-tight, diamond-sharp grooves in favor of more meditative, free-flowing epics that draw on elements of Latin jazz, pop, and even disco".

Track listing
All compositions by Lonnie Smith
 "Afrodesia" – 9:18
 "Spirits Free" – 15:00
 "Straight to the Point" – 6:54
 "Flavors" – 10:00
 "The Awakening" – 8:00
note: "Flavors" is actually John Coltrane's "Impressions"

Personnel
Lonnie Smith – organ, keyboards
Joe Lovano – tenor saxophone, soprano saxophone 
Greg Hopkins – trumpet (tracks 1–3)
Compliments of a friend (alias George Benson) – guitar (tracks 1, 4 & 5)
Ralphe Armstrong – electric bass (track 1) 
Ron Carter – electric bass (track 2)
Ben Riley – drums (tracks 1–3)
Jamey Haddad – drums, percussion (tracks 4 & 5)

References

Groove Merchant albums
Lonnie Smith (organist) albums
1975 albums
Albums produced by Sonny Lester
Jazz-funk albums